Anechites is a genus of flowering plants belonging to the family Apocynaceae.

Its native range is Caribbean, Central and Western South America to Venezuela.

Species:

Anechites nerium

References

Apocynaceae
Apocynaceae genera